Flabelligera is a genus of polychaetes in the family Flabelligeridae. Species are common around the world, in both temperate and cold waters. Flabelligera species have long, club-like papillae, which are encased in a smooth mucus sheath. They also have a distinct cephalic cage (a fan-like arrangement of chaetae around the head), and hooked neurochaeatae (ventral chaetae) which they use to hold onto rocks.

Flabelligera species are preyed on by a number of fish. They are most often found in waters with a temperature between 6.3 and 12.9 °C.

Species list 

 Flabelligera affinis, the flabby bristle-worm Sars, 1829
 Flabelligera bicolor (Schmarda, 1824)
 Flabelligera biscayensis Kolmer, 1985
 Flabelligera bophortica Annenkova-Chlopina, 1924
 Flabelligera diplochaetus (Otto, 1820)
 Flabelligera gourdoni Gravier, 1906
 Flabelligera grubei (Webster & Benedict, 1887)
 Flabelligera haswelli Salazar-Vallejo, 2012
 Flabelligera infundabularis, the sheathed bristle-cage worm Johnson, 1901
 Flabelligera japonica Jimi, Hasegawa, Taru, Oya, Kohtsuka, Tsuchida, Fujiwara & Woo, 2022
 Flabelligera kaimeiae Jimi, Hasegawa, Taru, Oya, Kohtsuka, Tsuchida, Fujiwara & Woo, 2022
 Flabelligera kajiharai Jimi, Hasegawa, Taru, Oya, Kohtsuka, Tsuchida, Fujiwara & Woo, 2022
 Flabelligera kozaensis Jimi, Hasegawa, Taru, Oya, Kohtsuka, Tsuchida, Fujiwara & Woo, 2022
 Flabelligera luctator (Stimpson, 1855)
 Flabelligera multipapillata Hartmann-Schröder, 1965
 Flabelligera nuniezi Salazar-Vallejo, 2012
 Flabelligera orensanzi Salazar-Vallejo, 2012
 Flabelligera pennigera Ehlers, 1908
 Flabelligera pergamentacea Ehlers, 1913
 Flabelligera picta Ehlers, 1913
 Flabelligera salazarae Salazar-Vallejo, 2012
 Flabelligera sekii Jimi, Hasegawa, Taru, Oya, Kohtsuka, Tsuchida, Fujiwara & Woo, 2022
 Flabelligera vaginifera (Rathke, 1843)

References 

Polychaete genera
Cosmopolitan animals